Clifton Village may refer to:

Clifton Village, Nottinghamshire
Clifton Village, Bristol